The 2010–11 Oakland Golden Grizzlies men's basketball team were a National Collegiate Athletic Association Division I college basketball team representing Oakland University.  OU won the conference regular season and conference tournament title for the second consecutive year.  Oakland received The Summit League's automatic berth into the 2011 NCAA Division I men's basketball tournament as a #13 seed against #4 seeded Texas.  The Golden Grizzlies lost the game 85–81.

Preseason
Oakland was picked to win The Summit League championship.  They received 29 of 34 first place votes.  Center Keith Benson was picked as the Preseason Conference Player of the Year and named to the All-League First Team.  Guard Larry Wright was named to the Second Team.

Joining the team for the 2010–11 season were guards Reggie Hamilton and Travis Bader.  Hamilton was eligible to play after sitting out the 2009–10 season.  Hamilton had transferred from fellow conference team UMKC.  Freshman Bader began playing after his redshirt season.  Also seeing significant minutes was freshman guard Ryan Bass.

Regular season
Oakland was the first Division I school to clinch the conference championship.  Oakland finished the season with a 34–2 record in their last 36 conference games spanning two seasons, which was the best in NCAA Division I.

Records
Oakland set The Summit League's record for most consecutive regular season conference wins with 17.  The 2009–10 Oakland team tied the same record last year, which was originally set by Cleveland State during 1991–92 and 1992–93 seasons.  Oakland won three more games before losing to IUPUI to set the record at 20 consecutive regular season conference wins.

Benson set The Summit League record for career blocked shots with 371.  He passed the mark of 317 set by Keith Closs of Central Connecticut State University from 1994–98.

Player of the Week
Benson won the conference's player of the week away three times this season (November 29, December 20 and January 24).  Point guard Reggie Hamilton won the award twice (January 18 and February 14).

All-league awards
Benson was named the conference's Player of the Year and coach Greg Kampe was named Coach of the Year.  Both won the awards for the second consecutive season.

Benson and junior guard Reggie Hamilton were named to the All-League First Team.  Senior forward Will Hudson was selected for the Second Team, freshman guard Bader was named to the All-Newcomer Team and senior guard Larry Wright was named the Sixth Man of the Year.  Benson was also named The Summit League's Defensive Player of the Year.

Roster

* Redshirting 2010–11 season
** Sitting out 2010–11 season due to transfer rules

Schedule

|-
!colspan=9| 2011 Summit League men's basketball tournament

|-
! colspan=9 | 2011 NCAA Division I men's basketball tournament

References

Oakland Golden Grizzlies
Oakland Golden Grizzlies men's basketball seasons
Oakland Golden Grizzlies
Oakland
Oakland